Minuca longisignalis, the longwave gulf fiddler, is a species of American broad-front fiddler crab in the family Ocypodidae.

Minuca longisignalis was formerly in the genus Uca, but in 2016 it was placed in the genus Minuca, a former subgenus of Uca.

References

Further reading

 

Ocypodoidea
Articles created by Qbugbot
Crustaceans described in 1968